Albrecht Fleckenstein (3 March 1917 – 4 April 1992) was a German pharmacologist and physiologist best known for his discovery of calcium channel blockers.

Life and career 
Albrecht Fleckenstein was born on 3 March 1917 in Aschaffenburg, Germany. He received his medical training in Würzburg and Vienna. In 1964, Fleckenstein reported on the inhibitory actions of prenylamine and verapamil on the physiological process of excitation–contraction coupling. This contributed to his discovery of calcium antagonists.

Awards 
In 1986, Fleckenstein received the Ernst Jung Prize, awarded annually for excellence in biomedical sciences. In 1991, he also received the Albert Einstein World Award of Science.

References

German pharmacologists
German physiologists
1917 births
1992 deaths
Albert Einstein World Award of Science Laureates
Commanders Crosses of the Order of Merit of the Federal Republic of Germany